The IZA - Institute of Labor Economics, until 2016 referred to as the Institute of the Study of Labor (IZA), is a private, independent economic research institute and academic network focused on the analysis of global labor markets and headquartered in Bonn, Germany.

History 
Founded in 1998, IZA is a non-profit limited-liability organization supported by the Deutsche Post Foundation and other national and international sources.

Restructuring 

On March 1, 2016, the Institute for the Study of Labor was restructured by Klaus Zumwinkel, CEO of the Deutsche Post Stiftung and president of IZA. A new institute on behavior and inequality research was founded while IZA will put more emphasis on policy-relevant research. Founding director Klaus F. Zimmermann, who did not accept these developments, left IZA on the 1st of March 2016.

Work

IZA runs the world's largest research network in economic science, comprising over 1,300 international Research Fellows and Affiliates, as well as Policy Fellows from business, politics, society and the media.

, the RePEc ranks IZA second of the top worldwide economic institutions in the field of labour economics as well as second of the top worldwide think tanks. In Germany it is the number one top economic institution.

In conducting labor market research, IZA cooperates closely with the Economics Department at the University of Bonn and the department's graduate education program at the Bonn Graduate School of Economics.

IZA's main focus is the economic analysis of national and international labor markets within a broad range of research areas. Furthermore, IZA provides policy advice on crucial labor market issues for national and international policy institutions.

Research 
IZA's research activities currently concentrate on eleven program areas providing high-standard labor market research on a wide array of topics:

To promote research on labor markets in developing countries, IZA launched in 2006, together with the World Bank, a joint research program on "Employment and Development". In addition, in its special research area "Growth and Labor Markets in Low Income Countries", IZA coordinates for the UK Department for International Development a substantial research program to promote growth and employment in low income countries.

Publications 
IZA publishes the series Research in Labor Economics together with Emerald Group Publishing.

In addition, it publishes the IZA journal series, which consists of three open access journals that focus on different aspects of international labor markets. The journals are published on IZA's behalf by Sciendo and do not charge any author fees. They were started in 2012 as 5 journals. The three journals are:

 IZA Journal of Labor Economics
 IZA Journal of Labor Policy
 IZA Journal of Development and Migration

Since May 2014, IZA publishes, together with Bloomsbury Publishing, IZA World of Labor, an open access resource providing empirically founded research articles on labor economics for a non-academic readership.

Awards

IZA Prize in Labor Economics 

Since 2002 IZA awards yearly the IZA Prize in Labor Economics for exceptional academic accomplishments in the field of labor economics. It is endowed with an award of 50,000 euros and is among the most prestigious economics awards worldwide.

Young Labor Economist Award 
In 2006, IZA also established the "IZA Young Labor Economist Award" to honor an outstanding published paper in labor economics written by researchers under 40 years of age at the time of publication. The prize money of 5,000 Euros is shared between the authors. Winners include:

 2006: Enrico Moretti::
 2007: Oriana Bandiera, Iwan Barankay, Imran Rasul::
 2008: Fabian Lange::
 2009: Alexandre Mas::
 2010: Raj Chetty::
 2011: Johannes Abeler, Steffen Altmann, Sebastian Kube, Mathias Wibral::
 2012: Scott Carrell and Mark Hoekstra::
 2013: Martha Bailey, Brad Hershbein and Amalia Miller::
 2014: Brian K. Kovak::

References

Further reading 
 Klaus F. Zimmermann. Migration, jobs and integration in Europe. Migration Policy Practice, Volume IV, Number 4, October–November 2014, pp. 4–16.

External links 
 
 IZA Prize Series at OUP
 GLM LIC DFID Project
 Research in Labor Economics homepage
 IZA Journal Series homepage
 IZA World of Labor homepage

Economic research institutes
Research institutes in Germany
Labor studies organizations
Labour economics
1998 establishments in Germany
Research institutes established in 1998
University of Bonn
Deutsche Post